Reproterol is a short-acting β2 adrenoreceptor agonist used in the treatment of asthma.

It was patented in 1965 and came into medical use in 1977.

Stereochemistry 
Reproterol contains a stereocenter and is  chiral. There are thus two enantiomers, the (R)-form and the (S)-form. The commercial preparations contain the drug as a racemate, an equal mixture of the two enantiomers.

References 

Antiasthmatic drugs
Beta-adrenergic agonists
Xanthines
Phenylethanolamines
Resorcinols